Malacoctenus aurolineatus, the Goldline blenny, is a species of labrisomid blenny native to the western Atlantic Ocean, including the Gulf of Mexico and the Caribbean Sea from southern Florida to northern South America. It prefers living in the vicinity of sea urchins. This species can reach a length of  TL.

References

aurolineatus
Fish of the Caribbean
Fish described in 1957